The 2022 season is Hougang United's 25th consecutive season in the Singapore Premier League. After finishing third in the 2021 Singapore Premier League, Hougang qualified for the 2022 AFC Cup.

Squad

Singapore Premier League

U21 Squad

Women's Squad

Coaching staff

Transfers

In

Pre-season

Mid-season

Note 1: Artur Jesus Vieira left the club on mutual consent despite signing the contract.

Loan Return 
Pre-season

Note 1: 

Mid-season

Out
Pre-season

Mid-season

Note 1:

Loan out
Pre-season

Note 1: Harhys Stewart returns on loan to GYL for another season.

Note 2: Zulfahmi Arifin loan to Sukhothai was cut short and he returned to the club for the 2022 season.

Note 3: Jordan Vestering will return to the club after completing his NS in June 2022.

Retained / Extension

Rumored 

Pre-season

Friendlies

Pre-Season Friendly

Mid-season Friendly

Team statistics

Appearances and goals

Competitions

Overview

Results summary (SPL)

Singapore Premier League

AFC Cup

Group stage

Singapore Cup

Group

Semi-final

Hougang United won 7-5 on aggregate.

Final

Competition (U21)

Stage 1 

 League table

Stage 2

 League table

Competition (U17)

U17 League

League table

See also 
 2014 Hougang United FC season
 2015 Hougang United FC season
 2016 Hougang United FC season
 2017 Hougang United FC season
 2018 Hougang United FC season
 2019 Hougang United FC season
 2020 Hougang United FC season
 2021 Hougang United FC season

Notes

References 

Hougang United FC
Hougang United FC seasons
2022
1